Kim Sae-byuk (born 24 October 1986) is a South Korean actress.

Filmography

Film

Television series

Awards and nominations

References

External links 
 
 
 

1986 births
Living people
21st-century South Korean actresses
South Korean film actresses
South Korean television actresses
South Korean stage actresses
Best Supporting Actress Paeksang Arts Award (film) winners